Admiral Hubert Grant-Dalton, CB (21 July 1862 – 22 April 1934) was a Royal Navy officer. During his career of nearly 40 years, he served in numerous small vessels, participated in three punitive expeditions in Africa, and commanded a cruiser during the first years of the First World War.

References 

1862 births
1934 deaths
Companions of the Order of the Bath
Royal Navy admirals
Royal Navy admirals of World War I